The GCW World Championship is a professional wrestling world championship created and promoted by the American promotion Game Changer Wrestling (GCW). It is the promotion's top championship for singles competitors. The current champion is Masha Slamovich, who is in her first reign.

Title history
There have been a total of 23 reigns shared between 21 different champions and three vacancies. Andrew Anderson was the inaugural champion. Nick Gage has the most reigns at three. Nick Gage's first reign is the longest at 722 days, while AJ Gray's reign is the shortest at less than a day. Gage is the oldest champion when he won it at 42 years old, while Low Ki is the youngest champion at 20 years old.

Masha Slamovich is the current champion in her first reign. She defeated Nick Gage at Eye for an Eye on March 17, 2023 in New York City.

Combined reigns 

References

External links 
  GCW World Title History at Cagematch.net

World professional wrestling championships